Aryeh Malkiel Kotler (born April 1951) is a Haredi rabbi and rosh yeshiva (dean) of Beth Medrash Govoha in Lakewood, New Jersey, one of the largest yeshivas in the world. He is a member of the Moetzes Gedolei HaTorah (Council of Torah Sages) of Agudath Israel of America.

Biography
Aryeh Malkiel Kotler was born to Shneur Kotler and his wife, Rischel (née Friedman). He is the second of 9 children. The elder Kotler was the rosh yeshiva (dean) of Beth Medrash Govoha in Lakewood, New Jersey and son of the yeshiva's founder, Aharon Kotler. On his father's side, Kotler is the great-grandson of Isser Zalman Meltzer. 

Upon the death of his father in 1982, Kotler was named co-rosh yeshiva of Beth Medrash Govoha along with Dovid Schustal, Yeruchem Olshin, and Yisroel Neuman, who are all married to grandchildren of Aharon Kotler. At that time, the yeshiva had an enrollment of approximately 800 students, which has since grown to approximately 6,300.

Kotler is a member of the Moetzes Gedolei HaTorah (Council of Torah Sages) of Agudath Israel of America.

Family
Kotler's first wife Hinda was the daughter of Yechiel Michel Feinstein and Lifsha, the granddaughter of Yitzchok Zev Soloveitchik. When Kotler traveled from their home in Israel to the US to visit his ailing father, his wife refused to join him. While Kotler was in the US his father died, and Kotler succeeded him as rosh yeshiva of Beth Medrash Govoha. This allowed him to take a second wife upon the depositing of the divorce document for the first wife with the rabbinical court. Several months later he married his second wife, Chana Leah Tikotzky.

References

1951 births
People from Lakewood Township, New Jersey
Rabbis from New Jersey
American Haredi rabbis
Rosh yeshivas
Beth Medrash Govoha
Beth Medrash Govoha alumni
Moetzes Gedolei HaTorah
Living people